Antherotoma is a genus of flowering plants belonging to the family Melastomataceae.

Its native range is Tropical and Southern Africa, Comoros, Madagascar.

Species:

Antherotoma angustifolia 
Antherotoma clandestina 
Antherotoma debilis 
Antherotoma densiflora 
Antherotoma gracilis 
Antherotoma irvingiana 
Antherotoma naudinii 
Antherotoma senegambiensis 
Antherotoma tenuis 
Antherotoma tisserantii

References

Melastomataceae
Melastomataceae genera